The qualification competition for the 2014 Norwegian Football Cup was a series of matches organised by the NFF.

A total of 188 teams entered the competition at the 1st Qualifying Round Stage – consisting of clubs from the lower reaches of the Norwegian football league system.

The first qualification match was played on 12 March 2014 and qualification spanning two rounds was concluded on 6 April 2014. A total of 679 goals were scored in the 141 qualifying matches (an average of 4.82 per match).



First qualifying round

Second qualifying round

 

 

 

 

 

 

 

 

 

 

 

 

 

 

 

 

 

 

 

 

 

 

 

 

 

 

 

 

 

 

 

 

 

 

 

 

 

 

 

 

 

 

 

 

 

 

qualifying rounds
Norwegian Football Cup qualifying rounds
2014 in Norwegian football